The 1878 Wimbledon Championships took place on the outdoor grass courts at the All England Lawn Tennis and Croquet Club in Wimbledon, London, United Kingdom. The tournament ran from 15 July until 20 July. It was the 2nd staging of the Wimbledon Championships, and the first Grand Slam tennis event of 1878. There were 34 competitors, excluding Spencer Gore who as champion was not required to participate until the best of the challengers had won the All comers' final. The winner of the All Comers' final was Frank Hadow, a planter from Ceylon who was on leave in Britain. He defeated Robert Erskine, a friend of the family who had enticed him to participate in the championship, in straight sets 6–4, 6–4, 6–4. On 18 July 1878 Hadow defeated reigning champion Spencer Gore in three sets, 7–5, 6–1, 9–7 before a crowd of about 700 spectators. Hadow effectively introduced the tactic of lobbing to counter Gore's volleying game.

Arthur Myers was the first player to serve over hand.

Gentlemen's singles

Final

 Frank Hadow defeated  Spencer Gore, 7–5, 6–1, 9–7 
This was Hadow's first and only Major.

All Comers' Final
 Frank Hadow defeated  Robert Erskine, 6–4, 6–4, 6–4

References

External links
 Official Wimbledon Championships website

 
Wimbledon Championship
Wimbledon Championship
Wimbledon Championship
July 1878 sports events